The 2022–23 Luge World Cup was a multi race tournament over a season for Luge, organised by the FIL. The season started on 4 December 2022 in Innsbruck, Austria, and concluded on 26 February 2023 in Winterberg, Germany.

Calendar

Results

Men's singles

Men's doubles

Women's singles

Women's doubles

Team relay

Standings

Men's singles Overall

Final standings after 12 events

Men's singles

Final standings after 9 events

Men's singles Sprint 

Final standings after 3 events
(*Champions 2022)

Women's singles Overall

Final standings after 12 events
(*Champion 2022)

Women's singles

Final standings after 9 events
(*Champion 2022)

Women's singles Sprint 

Final standings after 3 events
(*Champions 2022)

Men's doubles Overall

Final standings after 12 events
(*Champion 2022)

Men's doubles

Final standings after 9 events
(*Champion 2022)

Men's doubles Sprint 

Final standings after 3 events

Women's doubles Overall

Final standings after 12 events

Women's doubles

Final standings after 9 events

Women's doubles Sprint 

Final standings after 3 events

Team Relay 

Final standings after 6 events
(*Champion 2022)

Points

Podium table by nation 
Table showing the World Cup podium places (gold–1st place, silver–2nd place, bronze–3rd place) by the countries represented by the athletes.

References

External links 

 FIL streaming service

2022-23
2022 in luge
2023 in luge